WJAL (channel 68) is a television station licensed to Silver Spring, Maryland, United States, serving the Washington, D.C. area as an affiliate of NTD America. Owned by Entravision Communications, it is sister to Washington-licensed low-power, Class A station WMDO-CD (channel 47), which is currently silent. WJAL shares transmitter facilities with Washington-licensed CBS affiliate WUSA (channel 9) on Wisconsin Avenue in the Tenleytown section of northwest Washington.

History

As a Hagerstown station
The station first broadcast on August 1, 1984, originally licensed to Hagerstown, Maryland, as that city's third television station (after WHAG-TV and WWPB). It was also the fourth independent station in the Washington DMA (after WTTG, WDCA, and WCQR) and the first independent in the market outside the core city of Washington.

WJAL was the Washington market's charter WB affiliate when the network launched on January 11, 1995. Six weeks later, The WB added WFTY (channel 50, now CW affiliate WDCW), based in Washington proper. As WJAL had a largely rural coverage area far from Washington, both stations aired the network's programming. The station ended its WB affiliation on September 14, 1998, as management felt its programming did not fit with their family-friendly image.

In 2001, Good Companion Broadcasting, a Christian broadcasting non-profit organization, sold WJAL-TV to Entravision for $10.3 million. The main impetus of the purchase of WJAL for Entravision was to attempt to move the station's license to Silver Spring, Maryland as a replacement for its low-power WMDO-CA (now digital WMDO-CD), which at the time was a Univision affiliate. WJAL first attempted to move its then-proposed digital signal on channel 16 to Silver Spring in 2002. The application was denied as the Federal Communications Commission (FCC) determined local television service to Hagerstown would be unfairly affected. The proposed signal would also cause unacceptable interference to adjacent channel 17, which is used for public safety services in Washington. Entravision submitted an appeal in 2006, as it had changed WJAL's choice for its post-digital-transition channel from 16 to 39. By this time, the FCC had decided to stop considering the relocation of a station's city of license in preparation for the 2009 digital television transition. After the freeze, the FCC decided it would no longer support such a move and dismissed the application in 2012. Thus, WJAL continued to run a family-friendly English format for Hagerstown, a market with a traditionally low need for a Spanish-language outlet.

Spectrum sale and channel-sharing agreement; move to Washington
In the FCC's incentive auction, WJAL sold its channel 39 allocation for $25,492,333 and indicated that it would enter into a post-auction channel sharing agreement. On July 28, 2017, WJAL submitted a channel-sharing agreement with WUSA (channel 9). WJAL retained its existing callsign and virtual channel number, but moved its city of license to Silver Spring, Maryland. The over-the-air signal from Tuscarora Mountain went dark at midnight on September 30, 2017, and the station immediately moved to WUSA's transmitter in the early morning of October 1.

Although Entravision's stated goal was to convert WJAL to a UniMás affiliate, WJAL broadcast LATV instead. Entravision and Univision Communications entered into a 16-year joint sales agreement on January 1, 2006, under which Entravision operated Univision affiliate WFDC (channel 14). Current UniMás affiliate WMDO-CD (channel 47) was additionally bound to the network until the contract's expiration on December 31, 2021. A provision prohibiting Entravision from operating another station with a "Spanish-language format" in the Washington market was removed in a revision that took effect on the first weekday after the channel-share was implemented, October 2, 2017, allowing WJAL to air LATV.

In May 2018, WJAL switched its affiliation to the Heartland network. LATV has since returned to its previous location on WMDO-CD's second subchannel. WJAL flipped again to the brokered Sonlife Broadcasting Network on June 15, joining WWTD-LD as the second SBN station in Washington.

In September 2021, WJAL began airing NTD America programming.

Programming
Until its move to Washington, WJAL aired a mix of religious programming (especially on Sundays), public affairs programming, syndicated shows, sitcom reruns, movies, and children's programs.

WJAL produced a local newscast from the end of its WB affiliation in 1998 through October 2001, when it was suspended due to financial issues.

Until 2016, the station also carried West Virginia Tonight from WBOY-TV in Clarksburg, West Virginia; the program moved to WHAG-TV after WHAG's owner, Nexstar Broadcasting Group, acquired the West Virginia Media Holdings stations.

Technical information

Analog-to-digital conversion
WJAL shut down its analog signal, over UHF channel 68, on February 17, 2009, the original target date in which full-power television stations in the United States were to transition from analog to digital broadcasts under federal mandate (which was later pushed back to June 12, 2009). The station's digital signal remained on its pre-transition UHF channel 39. Through the use of PSIP, digital television receivers display the station's virtual channel as its former UHF analog channel 68, which was among the high band UHF channels (52-69) that were removed from broadcasting use as a result of the transition.

References

External links

JAL
JAL
Religious television stations in the United States
Television channels and stations established in 1987
1987 establishments in Maryland
Entravision Communications stations